The 1988 Citibank Open was a men's tennis tournament played on outdoor hard courts in Itaparica, Brazil that was part of the 1988 Nabisco Grand Prix. It was the third edition of the tournament and took place from 21 November through 27 November 1988. Unseeded Jaime Yzaga won the singles title.

Finals

Singles

 Jaime Yzaga defeated  Javier Frana 7–6(7–4), 6–2
 It was Yzaga's 1st singles title of the year and the 3rd of his career.

Doubles

 Sergio Casal /  Emilio Sánchez defeated  Jorge Lozano /  Todd Witsken 7–6(7–4), 7–6(7–4)

References

Citibank Open
Citibank Open
Itaparica